Grant Stauffer (1888-1949) was an American coal and railroad executive. He served as the president of the Sinclair Coal Company at one time, and headed the Kansas City, Missouri Chamber of Commerce.  He also served as the president of the Chicago Great Western Railway for five months between 1948 and his death from cancer in 1949.

References

1888 births
1949 deaths
20th-century American railroad executives
Chicago Great Western Railway presidents